The 2020 Duke Blue Devils football team represented Duke University in the 2020 NCAA Division I FBS football season as a member of the Atlantic Coast Conference (ACC). The Blue Devils were led by head coach David Cutcliffe, in his 13th year, and played their home games at Wallace Wade Stadium in Durham, North Carolina.

Previous season

The Blue Devils finished the season 5–7, 3–5 in ACC play to finish in sixth place in the Coastal Division.

Schedule
Duke had games scheduled against Charlotte, Elon, Middle Tennessee, and Wake Forest, which were all canceled due to the COVID-19 pandemic.

The ACC released their schedule on July 29, with specific dates selected at a later date.

Rankings

Game summaries

at Notre Dame

Boston College

at Virginia

Virginia Tech

at Syracuse

at NC State

Charlotte

North Carolina

Players drafted into the NFL

References

Duke
Duke Blue Devils football seasons
Duke Blue Blue Devils football